John Durand (c. 1719 – 1788), of Woodcote Lodge, Carshalton, Surrey, was an English politician who sat in the House of Commons between   1768  and 1784.

He served as a ship's captain for the East India Company and afterwards set up as a London merchant. He was made High Sheriff of Surrey for 1767–68.

He was a Member (MP) of the Parliament of Great Britain for Aylesbury 1768–1774, Plympton Erle 7 Feb. 1775–1780 and for Seaford 1780.

References

1719 births
1788 deaths
People from Carshalton
British MPs 1768–1774
British MPs 1774–1780
British MPs 1780–1784
Members of the Parliament of Great Britain for Plympton Erle
High Sheriffs of Surrey